Vietnam Posts and Telecommunications Group (VNPT), is a telecommunications company, owned by the Vietnamese Government, and the national post office of Vietnam. According to a list of UNDP in 2007, it is the second-largest company in Vietnam. It owns Vinaphone, one of the three largest mobile network operators in Vietnam. It was established in 1997 with the aim of providing communication and digital services to the entire nation. VNPT is responsible for providing internet and telephone services, digital TV services, mobile services, postal services, e-commerce, and other digital services to the general public. It has also been involved in several projects to develop the digital infrastructure of the country, such as connecting rural areas to the internet and building fiber optic networks. 

The main business product and service portfolios of VNPT include Telecommunications services; Digital services for enterprise and consumer customers; Other products and services: ICT manufacturing products, consultancy, designing and construction services in ICT sector. VNPT also operates international services, including international roaming, international calling, and international data services.

VNPT is a major player in the telecommunications industry in Vietnam, providing a wide range of services to both businesses and consumers. It has established partnerships with many international companies, such as Cisco and Qorvo, to develop advanced technologies and solutions to meet the needs of customers. Furthermore, VNPT has been actively involved in the development of e-commerce, digital payments, and other related services.

Subsidiaries
VNPT has a large number of subsidiaries, the most important of which are the following: 
 Regional Members
 VNPT-Vinaphone
 VNPT-Net
 VNPT-Media
 VNPT-IT
 VNPT-Technology

See also 
 List of Internet exchange points

References

External links

 

Telecommunications companies of Vietnam
Government-owned companies of Vietnam
Logistics companies of Vietnam